The Butler oscillator is a crystal-controlled oscillator that uses the crystal near its series resonance point.

References

Further reading
 (two-tube circuit was earlier)

External links

 
http://www.icmfg.com/crystaloscillatordata.html Two-transistor Butler
 Butler, Meacham, Sultzer, ...

Electronic oscillators